Song Kap-seok (Korean: 송갑석, born 10 October 1966) is a South Korean activist and politician serving as a member of National Assembly for West District of Gwangju, along with Chun Jung-bae. He is also the sole Democratic Party MP in Gwangju.

Biography 
Born in Goheung, Song attended to University of South Jeolla Province. He was a socialist activist from the end of 1980s to the early of 1990s. In 1990, he was arrested and detained until 1995.

After released, he started his political career. He then ran as an nonpartisan MP for South District of Gwangju in 2000, but was defeated with the vote of 9.17%. He then endorsed Roh Moo-hyun during the presidential election in 2002.

During the mid of 2000s, Song moved to the United States and started his further study. He then returned to South Korea and spoke up for human rights. Following the activities, Song ran again as independent MP for West 1st constituency but lost again.

Song later entered to the Democratic Party and contested again for the same constituency but was again defeated by Song Ki-sok of the People's Party, then Bareunmirae Party. Following the election annulment of Song Ki-sok in the early 2018, Song Kap-sok was considered again as a possible candidate. Despite of a controversy during the primary, Song was officially selected as the candidate and defeated the PDP candidate Kim Myong-jin with a high margin.

Controversies 
On 12 August 2018, Song had suggested a law amendment - replacing abductee (to North Korea) to missing - with several MPs from the same party. This movement was harshly criticised by abductees' relatives.

Two days later, Family Association for Abductees of 25 June declared to sue Song as defamation and offending National Security Act. The association condemned his action as "disrespecting victims and its relatives". They also continued that they would not decline their lawsuit.

Song was reported that he was praising Kim Il-sung during the investigation at Agency for National Security Planning (now National Intelligence Service) in 1991. During that time, he said "I admire Kim Il-sung. I feel happy when his healthy and vigorous face is appeared on television. The government of DPRK, who guarantees justice and autonomy, is the sole legal government of Korea. Korea must be reunified as DPRK because it is the true reunification."

Election results

General elections

References

External links 
 Song Kap-sok on Blog
 Song Kap-sok on Facebook
 Song Kap-sok on Twitter

1966 births
Living people
South Korean activists
Minjoo Party of Korea politicians
People from Goheung County